Bankinter, S.A., is a Spanish financial services company headquartered in Madrid. It has been listed on the Bolsa de Madrid since 1972, and is part of the Ibex35 Index. It was founded in 1965 as an industrial bank through a joint venture between Banco Santander and Bank of America.

History
Bankinter was founded under the name Banco Intercontinental Español in June 1965 as an industrial bank through a joint venture by Banco de Santander and BankAmerica. In 1972 the bank became fully independent of its founders and transformed itself into a commercial bank.

In 1993, the bank embarked up on a growth strategy with Banca Partnet and Red Agencial. In the same year, it became the first digital bank, following the successful introduction of electronic banking. In 2006, the brand was transformed.

In 2009, Bankinter purchased 50% of the insurance company Direct Line from The Royal Bank of Scotland.

In September 2015, Bankinter announced the acquisition of Barclays' retail business in Portugal, consisting of 84 offices, and Barclays Life and Pensions, the latter in a joint-venture with Mapfre. The bank paid approximately €100 million for Barclays' Portuguese subsidiary and €37.5 million for the 50% stake in the insurance company.

In May 2019, Bankinter acquired EVO Banco, incorporating its 452,000 clients.

Office network 
By September 30, 2021, Bankinter had a network of 446 offices and 6,119 employees.

Board of Directors 
The Board of Directors is composed of the following members:

The Secretary (non-Director) is Gloria Calvo Diaz.

See also

 List of banks in Spain

References

External links

Bankinter profile
Annual Report 2014 Bankinter

Banks based in Madrid
Banks established in 1965
IBEX 35
1965 establishments in Spain
Companies listed on the Madrid Stock Exchange
Spanish brands
Banks under direct supervision of the European Central Bank